The 1971 World Netball Championships were the third edition of the INF Netball World Cup, a quadrennial premier event in international netball. It was held in Kingston, Jamaica, and featured nine teams including the debut of the Bahamas. It began on 31 December 1970 with England and New Zealand winning their opening matches.

In eight matches, Australia retained the title back from New Zealand after winning all of their matches, New Zealand finished runners-up and England third.

Results

Table

Matches

Medallists

References

1971
1971 in netball
World
1971 in Jamaican sport
Sport in Kingston, Jamaica
20th century in Kingston, Jamaica
December 1970 sports events in North America
January 1971 sports events in North America